Enhancer of mRNA-decapping protein 3 is a protein that in humans is encoded by the EDC3 gene.

EDC3 is associated with an mRNA-decapping complex required for removal of the 5-prime cap from mRNA prior to its degradation from the 5-prime end (Fenger-Gron et al., 2005).[supplied by OMIM]

References

Further reading